The MYRRHA (Multi-purpose hYbrid Research Reactor for High-tech Applications) is a design project of a nuclear reactor coupled to a proton accelerator (a so-called accelerator-driven system (ADS)).  MYRRHA will be a lead-bismuth cooled fast reactor with two possible configurations: sub-critical or critical.

The project is managed by SCK CEN, the Belgian Centre for Nuclear Research. Its design will be adapted as a function of the experience gained from a first research project with a small proton accelerator and a lead-bismuth eutectic target: GUINEVERE.

MYRRHA is anticipated to be constructed in 2036, with a first phase (100 MeV LINAC accelerator) expected to be completed in 2026 if successfully demonstrated.

Components 

MYRRHA is a project presently under development of a research reactor aiming to demonstrate the feasibility of the ADS and the lead-cooled fast reactor concepts, with various research applications from spent-fuel irradiation to material irradiation testing. A linear accelerator is under development to provide a beam of fast proton that hits a spallation target, producing neutrons. These neutrons are necessary to keep the nuclear reactor running when operated in sub-critical mode, but to increase its versatility the reactor is also designed to operate in critical mode with fast neutron and thermal neutron zones.

Accelerator 
The accelerator will accelerate protons to an energy of 600 MeV with a beam current of up to 4 mA. In subcritical mode, if the accelerator stops the reactor power drops immediately. To avoid thermal cycles the accelerator needs to be extremely reliable. MYRRHA aims at no more than 10 outages longer than three seconds per 100 days. A first prototype stage of the accelerator was started in 2020.

ISOL@MYRRHA 
The high reliability and intense beam current required for operating such a machine makes the proton accelerator potentially interesting for online isotope separation. Phase I of the project therefore also includes the design and feasibility study of ISOL@MYRRHA to investigate exotic isotopes.

Spallation target 
The protons collide with a liquid lead-bismuth eutectic. The high atomic number of the target leads to a large number of neutrons via spallation.

Reactor 

The pool type, or the loop type, reactor will be cooled by a lead-bismuth eutectic. Separated into a fast neutron zone and a thermal neutron zone, the reactor is planned to use a mixed oxide of uranium and plutonium (with 35 wt. % ).

Two operating modes are foreseen: critical and sub-critical.

In sub-critical mode, the reactor is planned to run with a criticality under 0.95: On average a fission reaction will induce less than one additional fission reaction, the reactor does not have enough fissile material to sustain a chain reaction on its own and relies on the neutrons from the spallation target. As additional safety feature the reactor can be passively cooled when the accelerator is switched off.

See also 
ASTRID
Fast breeder reactor
Fast neutron reactor
Gas-cooled fast reactor
Generation IV reactor
Integral Fast Reactor
Sodium-cooled fast reactor

References

External links 
 
 
 

Liquid metal fast reactors
Neutron sources
Nuclear reactors
Nuclear research reactors
Nuclear technology
Pressure vessels